Donald Keith Marriott (10 February 1916 – 1989) was an Australian politician.

He was born in Tyenna, Tasmania. In 1961 he was elected to the Tasmanian Legislative Council as the Labor member for Derwent. He served one term, until his defeat in 1967. Marriott died in 1989.

References

1916 births
1989 deaths
Members of the Tasmanian Legislative Council
Australian Labor Party members of the Parliament of Tasmania
20th-century Australian politicians